Richard Langley D.D. (1563 – May 1615) was Head Master of Eton College from 1591 - 1611 and a Canon of Windsor for a few days in 1615

Career

He was King’s Scholar at Eton College and educated at King's College, Cambridge, where he graduated with BA in 1585, MA in 1588, B.D. in 1595 and D.D. in 1607.

He was appointed:
Head Master of Eton College 1594 -  1611
Rector of Horton, Buckinghamshire
Rector of Paglesham and Latchingdon, Essex 1608 - 1615

He was appointed to the third stall in St George's Chapel, Windsor Castle in 1615 but died a few days after his appointment.

Notes 

1563 births
1615 deaths
Canons of Windsor
Alumni of King's College, Cambridge
Head Masters of Eton College
People educated at Eton College
Eton King's Scholars